Andrea Ashworth (born 1969) is an English writer and academic, known for her memoir Once in a House on Fire, which won the Somerset Maugham Award from the Society of Authors in 1999.

Early life and education
Ashworth was born in Manchester in 1969. She studied at Xaverian College in Manchester She studied at Hertford College, Oxford, where she was a scholar. She later became a Junior Research Fellow of Jesus College, Oxford.

Career
Once in a House on Fire, published in 1998, won the Somerset Maugham Award from the Society of Authors in 1999. It tells the story of her traumatic upbringing and the abuse that she suffered at the hands of her two stepfathers.

See also

 List of alumni of Hertford College
 List of people from Manchester

References

Date of birth missing (living people)
1969 births
20th-century English women writers
20th-century English memoirists
21st-century English women writers
Alumni of Hertford College, Oxford
Fellows of Jesus College, Oxford
Living people
British women memoirists
Writers from Manchester